The Yeangder Heritage was a golf tournament on the Asian Tour. It was played for the first time in April 2017 at the National Golf Country Club in Taipei, Taiwan. Prize money was US$300,000. The tournament is an upgrade of the Ambassador ADT tournament played on the Asian Development Tour in 2015 and 2016.

Winners

References

External links
Coverage on the Asian Tour's official site

Former Asian Tour events
Golf tournaments in Taiwan